Black Hood was an American radio serial based on the popularity of the US superhero comics series Black Hood. It was broadcast on the Mutual Broadcasting System July 5, 1943 – January 14, 1944.

Concept
Rookie police officer Kip Burland had a secret identity, the Black Hood. Donning a specific, "specially developed" black hood gave Burland special magical powers. The only person who knew about Burland's secret identity was Barbara Sutton, a newspaper reporter who helped him fight crime.

The American comics series Black Hood had been a popular comic strip since its first appearance in the ninth issue of Top-Notch Comics in October 1940. On July 5, 1943, a radio serial debuted on the Mutual Broadcasting System. It aired in episodes of 15 minutes and five times a week, at 5:15 in the afternoon. The opening theme music was a snippet from Paul Dukas's The Sorcerer's Apprentice.

Compared to the source material the radio serial was less violent and sexually suggestive. The show also introduced a third character, Police Sergeant McGinty.

120 episodes were recorded. Because it failed to find a sponsor its last broadcast was January 14, 1944. Only one audio copy has survived, the initial episode "Emerald Voodoo Ring" which was recorded as the audition disc.

Cast
 The Black Hood: Scott Douglas
 Kip Burland: Scott Douglas
 Barbara "Babs" Sutton: Marjorie Cramer

See also
The Adventures of Superman
The Green Hornet  
The Shadow

Sources

American radio dramas
1943 radio programme debuts
1944 radio programme endings
Radio programs based on comic strips
Mutual Broadcasting System programs